Carl Bogdanovich Wenig or, in German, Carl Gottlieb Wenig (Russian: Карл Богданович Вениг; 26 February 1830, in Tallinn – 6 February 1908, in Saint Petersburg) was a Baltic-German painter of historical and religious scenes. For many years, he was a professor at the Imperial Academy of Arts.

Biography 
His father, Gottlieb (1804-1874), was a music teacher and organist at St. Nicholas' Church. His mother, Agathe (1808-1895), was an amateur artist and the aunt of Peter Carl Fabergé. From 1844 to 1853, he studied at the Imperial Academy of Arts with Fyodor Bruni. During his time there, he won several medals, including a gold medal for his depiction of Esther before Ahasuerus. Upon graduating, he was awarded a stipend that enabled him to continue his studies in Rome, where he remained for six years.

In 1860, he was awarded the title of "Academician" for his painting "The Entombment". Two years later, he was recognized as an Artist of Historical Painting on the strength of his depiction of two angels proclaiming the death of Sodom. He began to teach drawing at the Academy that same year.

In 1869, he became an Associate Professor and was promoted to a fully tenured Professor of the second-degree in 1876. He was advanced to the first-degree in 1888. After 1871, he served as a member of the Academy's governing board. In addition to his canvases, he created several decorative murals and icons at the Cathedral of Christ the Saviour.

His brothers, Bogdan and Pyotr (1849-1888) also became painters.

Selected paintings

References

Literature

External links 

1830 births
1908 deaths
People from Tallinn
People from the Governorate of Estonia
Baltic-German people
19th-century painters from the Russian Empire
Russian male painters
Russian genre painters
History painters
19th-century male artists from the Russian Empire
Imperial Academy of Arts alumni
Members of the Imperial Academy of Arts
Awarded with a large gold medal of the Academy of Arts